Babesia bigemina is a species of alveolates belonging to the phylum Apicomplexa and the family Babesiidae, a type of protozoan parasite. In cattle, it causes babesiosis, also called "Texas fever". Its length is 4–5 µm and its width is 2–3 µm. Usually, it has an oval shape. In blood cells, it is located midsagittally and can reach up to two-thirds of the diameter of the blood cell in size. It is transmitted by Boophilus ticks which are prevalent in the tropics. The genome for B. bigemina is incomplete and unassembled.

Further reading 
 
 
 

bigemina
Species described in 1926
Parasites of mammals